Ancón is a rural parish of Santa Elena canton in the province of Guayas, Ecuador.

People began settling in the area in late 1923, when the Government of Ecuador conceded 98 mines, occupying an area of 38,842 hectares, to the British oil company Anglo Ecuadorian Oilfields. The area was initially used as a mining camp.

For many years, the oilfields were of major national economic importance. In 1911, the first barrel of oil was extracted from the Ancon 1 well As the first oil city in Ecuador, many families of mostly European backgrounds relocated to the area in search of work, increasing the area's stature. They remained after the British company left in 1979, taking up such trades as fishing.

In subsequent years, Ancón achieved rapid population growth and economic development In mid-November 2002, Ancón became a separate province.

References

Cantons of Guayas Province